Bryhn is a surname. Notable people with the surname include:

Asbjørn Bryhn (1906–1990), Norwegian police officer, resistance member, and head of intelligence
Håkon Bryhn (1901–1968), Norwegian sailor 
Ole-Kristian Bryhn (born 1989), Norwegian sport shooter

Norwegian-language surnames